Statistics of Nemzeti Bajnokság I in the 1963 season.

Overview
It was contested by 14 teams, and Győri ETO FC won the championship.

League standings

Results

Statistical leaders

Top goalscorers

References
Hungary - List of final tables (RSSSF)

Nemzeti Bajnokság I seasons
1962–63 in Hungarian football
1963–64 in Hungarian football
Hun
Hun